Qeshlaq-e Qarah Jalu may refer to:
 Qeshlaq-e Qarah Jalu Hajji Iman
 Qeshlaq-e Qarah Jalu Hajji Sadeq